Rafi Cohen, or Raphi Cohen may refer to:

 Rafi Cohen (footballer, born 1965), Israeli football striker and football manager
 Rafi Cohen (footballer, born 1970), Israeli football goalkeeper
 Rafi Cohen (footballer, born 1974), Israeli football striker
 Raphi Cohen (born 1975), Israeli chef